San Juan is the capital and largest city of the Argentine province of San Juan in the Cuyo region, located in the Tulúm Valley, west of the San Juan River, at   above mean sea level, with a population of around 112,000 as per the  (over 500,000 in the metropolitan area).

It is a modern city with wide streets and well-drawn avenues with wide sidewalks and vegetation of different species of trees irrigated by canals, from which it derives its nickname oasis town.

It has an important accommodation infrastructure and transportation. It highlights modern buildings and the surroundings, the reservoir and Ullum dam, spas, museums, large plantations of vines, and various types of agriculture, with wine being the most important.

History and architecture 

Before the arrival of the Spanish Conquistadores, the Huarpe Indians inhabited this area.

San Juan de la Frontera was founded on June 13, 1562, by Juan Jufré at the shore of the San Juan River.

San Juan was a sleepy, provincial town during colonial times (1562–1810) and took practically no part in the internal wars that devastated Argentina in its so-called Organizational Period (1820–1860.) Two of the most prominent members of the 1816 Congress of Tucumán which declared Argentina's independence from Spain, however, came from San Juán: Francisco Narciso de Laprida, who was president of the congress, and San Juan's bishop Friar Justo Santa María de Oro, a Dominican friar and an eloquent speaker whose persuasive oratory was largely responsible for Argentina becoming a republic and not a monarchy like Brazil.

Probably the most important and famous city son was Fray Justo's nephew, and president of Argentina between 1868 and 1874, Domingo Faustino Sarmiento, whose birthplace was turned into a National Historical Monument in 1910, during the administration of president Roque Sáenz Peña.

On January 15, 1944, a powerful earthquake devastated the city, killing around 10,000 people and leaving half of the provincial population homeless. Another quake, 7.4 in the Richter magnitude scale, struck 80 km northeast of the city on November 23, 1977, causing considerable damage and killing 65 people around the province.

After the disaster of 1944, the city was reconstructed on concentric boulevards, with straight, well-lit, tree-lined avenues and modern housing. It has mostly lost its colonial aspect, but retains an open, sunny Mediterranean look.

Geography and climate
The city of San Juan is located in a fertile valley within a rocky mountainous area. The range of the mean monthly temperatures is 19.4 °C, possibly the highest in all South America. Sunny weather is common in all months and San Juan averages about 3,361.3 hours of bright sunshine, or about 76% of possible sunshine, ranging from a low of 68% in June to a high of 81% possible sunshine in May. Under the Köppen climate classification, San Juan has a desert climate (BWh/BWk).

Since very little rain falls in the region, the San Juan River has been dammed to provide a regular source of water to the city. The resulting reservoir is located in Ullum, and is known as the Quebrada de Ullum Dam. The dam also provides electrical power to the region.

Sixty-five percent of the surrounding area's agricultural production is related to wine production.

Urban aspect 

The city of San Juan completely changed its appearance from a colonial one to one of the most modern in the country after the earthquake of 1944, with well-drawn and wide paved streets, ample sidewalks of tiles or mosaics, and lined with acacias, moreras and paradise trees irrigated by quaint canals.

The city is located within the Capital District, which was planned in the form of a checkerboard anchored by Las Heras Avenue (from North to South), 25 de Mayo Av. (East to West), 9 de Julio Av. (east to west) and Guillermo Rawson Avenue (north to south). These four avenues form a perfect rectangle of 16 blocks in width (going from east to west and vice versa -horizontally-) by 10 blocks long (going up and down or North to South, and vice versa). This center of this rectangle is a square of 7 blocks in length by 6 blocks wide, delimited by Leandro N. Alem, Córdoba, Libertador San Martín and Rioja Avenues. This area is the city's downtown and, as such, is the most densely populated and concentrates most of the city's commercial, financial and institutional activities.

The most important perpendicular avenues are Mitre (known for its cinemas and cyber cafés), José Ignacio de la Roza (built after the 1944 earthquake), commercial Santa Fe Avenue, Rivadavia street (the easternmost two blocks of which have been pedestrianized), and San Martín Avenue (which leads to most access routes towards Greater San Juan). The more important parallel arteries are Mendoza Avenue (leading to Villa Krause), General Mariano Acha Av. and Rioja Avenue.

Some of the city's most important landmarks are:

Cathedral
Designed by architect Daniel Ramos Correa, the cathedral was inaugurated on December 16, 1979.  The bell tower is a steeple of 51 meters (170 feet) in height, and features a British clock and a German carillon which sounds every 15 minutes. The interior is accessed through a bronze vestibule crafted Faenza, Italy with bas-reliefs of Saint Rose of Lima, Saint Louis of France, the Apostle Santiago, Saint Anne and several shields and emblems. In the basement of the church is the crypt, the pantheon of the bishops and the chapel of Friar Justo Santa María de Oro.

25 May Park 
This is the city's principal urban park, providing a green space with a colorful variety of flora. The park also features 19th century-era monuments to President Domingo Sarmiento and Friar Justo Santa María de Oro. The central fountain, dating from 1871, was remodeled on several occasions.

Aberastain Park
Named for a former governor, the park features a monument to its namesake (Antonio Aberastain).

Peatonal Tucumán and Rivadavia
The city's most important, pedestrianized streets, their well-landscaped setting and variety of retail outlets make them favorites among both locals and tourists.

May Park
Named to commemorate the May Revolution of 1810, the park a children's section, an artificial lake with an island, fish and aquatic birds, a velodrome, and numerous sculptures and monuments to General José de San Martín, Governor Federico Cantoni, and to sports.

Transport
 
The city has modern transport infrastructure and is accessible via a ring road, and the South Access Freeway, among others. The city's outward growth has made a second ring road necessary, and the project is under construction. The motorway will reduce commuting times from Greater San Juan to downtown, and will also facilitate large freight truck traffic (diverting it from the city proper). It also calls for a complementary project for another motorway called South Corridor, connecting downtown San Juan with Rawson and other southern suburbs.

The urban public transport passengers from the City of San Juan consists of bus lines marked with numbers and letters (19 or 26A), linking the city centre with the various neighbourhoods and the rest of the Great San Juan. The city also has taxi service and remises.

The rapid growth of the city has necessitated new means of transportation, and a feasibility study was recently commissioned on the development of a trolley service between downtown and Greater San Juan.  The proposed routes would unite Chimbas-San Juan (Center)-Villa Krause and Rivadavia-San Juan (Center)-Santa Lucia, as well as one circulating downtown.

Long distance public transport is provided by the modern Bus Terminal, with more than 6,000 sq metres (64,000 Sq ft) of area in platforms. The terminal also includes administration offices, ticketing, information, a police precinct, a first-aid room, telephone booths, shops, a restaurant, and other facilities.

Domingo Faustino Sarmiento Airport is located 15 kilometers from the city in 9 de Julio Department, more precisely in the village of Las Chacritas. This airport serves routes from San Juan to Buenos Aires.
	
The city is situated on National Route 40, connecting it with Mendoza (168 km) to the south and La Rioja (449 km) to the north; National Route 20 connects San Juan to San Luis (323 km to the east). Distances to other important cities are as follows: Córdoba (585 km), Catamarca (623 km) and Buenos Aires (1110 km).

Main sights

The old cathedral, an 18th-century Jesuit style building, was destroyed in the 1944 earthquake,  but has been replaced by a modern-Tuscan-romanesque building with a campanile. San Juan is the seat of a Roman Catholic metropolitan Archbishop and a Catholic University. San Juan possesses the Juan Victoria Auditorium, one of the most modern and active concert halls in Argentina, as well as many leafy parks and squares, including Parque de Mayo with its vast artificial lake.

In October 2016, the Teatro del Bicentenario opened in downtown San Juan, which allows for 1129 spectators, the largest in the Province and has become one of its main tourist attractions.

Tourism to San Juan is centered around wine production and dégustation as well as the  rock formations in places like the Ischigualasto National Park (which includes the Valle de la Luna), 330 km north of the city, and the Quebrada de Ullum Dam (18 km from the city).

An integral attraction to the province is its large Triassic period fossil record, believed to be one of the largest in the world. 

There is also the Mariano Gambier Archeology museum at La Laja, Albardón county, some 25 km from the center of the city. It concerns itself with the many cultures that inhabited San Juan from Pre-History till the arrival of the Spaniards in 1560. It has a priceless collection of Indian artifacts, cave paintings and other elements of agriculture and life in the Tulum valley from the last 8500 years.

The city also hosts the Fiesta Nacional del Sol, a festival that celebrates nature over five days in February.

Museums in the city include:

Casa Domingo Faustino Sarmiento, located at the intersection of Libertador General San Martín Avenue and Sarmiento street. Made a National Historic Monument in 1910, this was the first site so designated in Argentina. The local educator and President of the Republic from 1868 to 1874, Domingo Sarmiento, was born here in 1811 and raised here, as well.
San Martin's Monastic Cell, in the Santo DOmingo Convent, where Jose de San Martin, a military leader who led independence campaigns in Argentina, Chile and Peru, stayed during a 1815 visit to the city to raise support for the revolutionary wars. It maintains its simple furniture from the time of his visit.
Franklin Rawson Museum of Fine Arts/Agustín Gnecco Historical Provincial Museum, named after the local painter Benjamin Franklin Rawson (1819–1871). It houses a  patrimony of paintings and sculptures, engravings and drawings from national artists. The Gnecco Museum features elements related to fashion in the 18th and 19th centuries, Creole silverwork, as well as historic numismatics and philately collections.  
Amid Read Museum/Carlos Gardel House of Tango provides displays and videos outlining the development of Argentine Tango, and its evolution in the 20th century. Conferences, discussions, and violin and bandoneón classes are among the activities hosted here.
  Natural Sciences Museum. This facility, housed in a former railway station is known for its dinosaur fossil collections, found mainly in the nearby Ischigualasto Valley.

Wine Region

San Juan is ranked second among the wine-producing provinces of Argentina. It has a cultivated area of 116,700 acres at altitudes of between 1,970 (601m) and 4,590 feet (1399m) above sea level.  This region specializes in Syrah, Malbec, Cabernet Sauvignon, Bonarda, Chardonnay and Torrontés.
Because of this area's semi-desert climate, viticulture is dependent on irrigation from the San Juan and Jáchal Rivers.

Notable residents

Bandoneon musician, composer, and arranger Juan Pablo Jofre was born and raised in San Juan before relocating to New York City.
César Garipe (born 1981), Argentine former professional footballer
Telma Reca (1904 – 1979), pioneer in child and adolescent psychology and psychiatry was born in San Juan.

References

External links

Página Oficial de la Provincia de San Juan (Spanish)
Municipality of San Juan - Official website.

 
Populated places in San Juan Province, Argentina
Capitals of Argentine provinces
Populated places established in 1562
Cities in Argentina
1562 establishments in the Spanish Empire
Argentina
San Juan Province, Argentina